Mark Plowman may refer to:

 Max Plowman, also known as Mark VII
Mark Plowman (The Messengers), fictional character